Richard Kennar (born 10 December 1994) is a Samoan professional rugby league footballer who plays as a er and  for the South Sydney Rabbitohs  in the NRL. 

He previously played for the Melbourne Storm and the Brisbane Broncos, and was contracted to the Canterbury-Bankstown Bulldogs in the National Rugby League.

Early life
Kennar was born in Apia, Samoa, and moved to Melbourne, Victoria, Australia at a young age. He studied at Roxburgh Secondary College, and was then educated at Craigieburn Secondary College where he represented 2011 Australian Schoolboys.

He played his junior rugby league for the Northern Thunder, before being signed by the Melbourne Storm.

Playing career

Early career
From 2012 to 2014, he played for the Melbourne Storm's NYC team.

He 2015 he moved on to the Storm's Queensland Cup team, Eastern Suburbs Tigers.

2015
In round 13 of the 2015 NRL season, Kennar made his NRL debut for the Melbourne Storm against Penrith. He played six games in his debut season, scoring one try.

2016
Kennar played a further three games for Melbourne in 2016, scoring one try. In November, he signed a two-year contract with the Canterbury-Bankstown Bulldogs starting in 2017.

2017
Kennar was unable to break into Canterbury's first-grade team in 2017. 

In October, he was granted a release from his Canterbury contract and signed a two-year contract with the South Sydney Rabbitohs starting in 2018.

2018
Kennar made his South Sydney debut in round 1 of the season, scoring two tries in Souths 32–20 defeat by the New Zealand Warriors. On the 15th of June it was announced that Kennar would be released from his final year at South Sydney Rabbitohs to complete a two-year Mormon mission at the start of 2019.

2019
He later signed a train and trial contract with the Brisbane Broncos.

2020
In round 12 of the 2020 NRL season, Kennar scored two tries for Brisbane in a 36–26 loss to Cronulla at Suncorp Stadium.

Kennar played a total of 10 games for Brisbane in the 2020 NRL season as the club suffered their worst ever year both on and off the field culminating in the club's first Wooden Spoon.

2021
Kennar made only two appearances for Brisbane in the 2021 NRL season.

2022
Kennar then rejoined South Sydney for the 2022 NRL season. In round 17, Kennar scored a hat-trick in South Sydney's victory over Newcastle.

Kennar was called into the South Sydney side as cover for the injured Alex Johnston for their preliminary final match against Penrith. Kennar scored a first half try during the game as Souths lead 12-0 before Penrith came back in the second half to win 32-12.

References

External links
Brisbane Broncos profile
South Sydney Rabbitohs profile
Canterbury Bulldogs profile
Melbourne Storm profile
Wynnum Manly Seagulls profile

1994 births
Living people
Brisbane Broncos players
Eastern Suburbs Tigers players
Melbourne Storm players
Rugby league centres
Rugby league wingers
Samoan rugby league players
South Sydney Rabbitohs players
Sportspeople from Apia
Sunshine Coast Falcons players
Rugby league players from Melbourne
Samoan emigrants to Australia